Molodyozhnaya ("Youth") (also known as "Molodezhnaya") was a Soviet, then Russian research station in East Antarctica at 67°40′S 45°50′E. After being mothballed in 1990, it was reopened in 2006 to operate on a seasonal basis. In Russian, the station is sometimes referred to as the capital of Antarctica.

Location
Molodyozhnaya Station is located in the Thala Hills, 500–600 meters inland from the coast on the southern shore of Alasheyev Bight in the Cosmonaut Sea, at 42 meters above sea level. The area around the station is composed mostly of rocky ridges separated by snow-covered depressions and lakes. The sea near the station is covered in pack ice for much of the year, out to a distance of as much as 100 km at the end of winter. The rise to the summit of the massive East Antarctic Ice Sheet (Dome A) begins 1.5-2.0 km from the shore. Kheis Glacier is located in 15 km east of the station, and Campbell Glacier is roughly the same distance to the southwest.

History
The site was opened in February 1962, and used as a launch site for suborbital meteorological sounding rockets. From 25 May 1969 and 26 December 1990, 1104 M-100 model research sounding rockets were launched from Molodyozhnaya Station. On 28 February 1979, the MMR06 model was launched from Molodyozhnaya. This was the only instance of this model rocket being launched from Molodyozhnaya Station.

Funding for meteorological research became scarce during the late 1980s, as the Soviet Union was collapsing. Launches of the M-100 abruptly ended in 1990, and the station was mothballed. In the 1990s, several scientific and environmental studies were undertaken in the area to fulfill the requirements of the Protocol for the Defence of Nature in the Antarctic Treaty System, but the station wasn't reopened.

In February 2006, Valeriy Lukin, the head of the Russian Antarctic Expedition (RAE), said:There are plans to open the mothballed stations Molodyozhnaya, Leningradskaya and Russkaya in the 2007-2008 season.  This will bring great benefits because these stations are located in the Pacific section of Antarctica, which is poorly covered by scientific studies.

Since 2006, it has operated on a seasonal basis.  When open during the Antarctic summer there is occasional amateur radio operation by station personnel.

Climate
The average temperature varies from −19 °C in the coldest months (July–August), to around 0 °C in January.

See also

History of Antarctica
List of Antarctic expeditions
 List of Antarctic research stations
 List of Antarctic field camps
 Airports in Antarctica
Soviet Antarctic Expedition

References

External links
 Official website Arctic and Antarctic Research Institute
 Molodezhnaya website at Encyclopedia Astronautica
 AARI Molodezhnaya Station page
 COMNAP Antarctic Facilities
 COMNAP Antarctic Facilities Map

East Antarctica
Meteorological stations
Outposts of Antarctica
Soviet Union and the Antarctic
Russia and the Antarctic
1962 establishments in Antarctica
1990 disestablishments in Antarctica
2006 establishments in Antarctica
Meteorology in the Soviet Union